Kazachinsky (masculine), Kazachinskaya (feminine), or Kazachinskoye (neuter) is the name of several rural localities in Russia:
Kazachinskoye, Irkutsk Oblast, a selo in Kazachinsko-Lensky District of Irkutsk Oblast; 
Kazachinskoye, Krasnoyarsk Krai, a selo in Kazachinsky Selsoviet of Kazachinsky District in Krasnoyarsk Krai